Ipili is an Engan language of the East New Guinea Highlands in Enga Province, Papua New Guinea.

There are two dialects, Porgera-Paiela and Tipinini. The latter is similar to Enga.
Missionary Terrance Borchard guided translation of the New Testament in the Paiela dialect.  Working with the Ipili tribe they developed an alphabet and written language, previously spoken. He began the work in 1969 until his death in Aug. 2014.
Literacy work resulted.

References

Engan languages
Languages of Enga Province
Languages of Papua New Guinea